John Butrovich Jr. (March 22, 1910 – June 3, 1997) was an American businessman and politician from Alaska. He was a member of the Republican Party, and was that party's nominee in the 1958 gubernatorial election.

Life & career
Born in a mining camp near Fairbanks, Alaska to a Croatian American family, Butrovich graduated from Fairbanks High School in 1929. He then went to Washington State University. He returned to Fairbanks and was in the insurance business. He married Grace Butrovich in 1936, and they had 1 daughter together. From 1944 to 1958, Butrovich served in the Alaska Territorial Senate and was a Republican. He was the speaker of the delegation sent to President Eisenhower to convince him to sign the statehood bill. In 1958, Butrovich ran in the election for Governor of Alaska and lost the election to Bill Egan, 59.6% to 39.4%. From 1963 to 1979, Butrovich served in the Alaska State Senate. He was named Alaskan of the Year in 1980, and awarded an honorary degree by the University of Alaska. The Butrovich Building, a building on the University of Alaska Fairbanks campus which runs the University of Alaska's statewide administration, is named after him.

Death
Butrovich died at his home in Fairbanks, Alaska after a battle with a long illness. He was 87.

Notes

1910 births
1997 deaths
Republican Party Alaska state senators
American businesspeople in insurance
American people of Montenegrin descent
Businesspeople from Fairbanks, Alaska
Insurance agents
Members of the Alaska Territorial Legislature
Politicians from Fairbanks, Alaska
University of Alaska people
Washington State University alumni
20th-century American politicians
20th-century American businesspeople